Montana Bluff is an ice-covered peak rising to 670 m at the end of a side ridge running south-southeast from Ticha Peak in central Bowles Ridge, Livingston Island.  Surmounting Perunika Glacier to the west and southwest, and Huron Glacier to the east and southeast.  It is named after the city of Montana in Northwestern Bulgaria.

Location

Maps
 L.L. Ivanov et al. Antarctica: Livingston Island and Greenwich Island, South Shetland Islands. Scale 1:100000 topographic map. Sofia: Antarctic Place-names Commission of Bulgaria, 2005.
 L.L. Ivanov. Antarctica: Livingston Island and Greenwich, Robert, Snow and Smith Islands. Scale 1:120000 topographic map.  Troyan: Manfred Wörner Foundation, 2009.
 A. Kamburov and L. Ivanov. Bowles Ridge and Central Tangra Mountains: Livingston Island, Antarctica. Scale 1:25000 map. Sofia: Manfred Wörner Foundation, 2023.

References
 Bulgarian Antarctic Gazetteer. Antarctic Place-names Commission. (details in Bulgarian, basic data in English)
 Montana Bluff. SCAR Composite Antarctic Gazetteer

External links
 Montana Bluff. Copernix satellite image

Cliffs of Livingston Island
Montana, Bulgaria